PJSC Rosneft Oil Company ( stylized as ROSNEFT) is a Russian integrated energy company headquartered in Moscow. Rosneft specializes in the exploration, extraction, production, refining, transport, and sale of petroleum, natural gas, and petroleum products. The company is controlled by the Russian government through the Rosneftegaz holding company. Its name is a portmanteau of the Russian words .

Rosneft was founded in 1993 as a state enterprise and then incorporated in 1995, acquiring a number of state-controlled gas and oil assets. It became Russia's leading oil company after purchasing assets of the former oil company Yukos at state-run auctions. After acquiring OJSC TNK-BP in 2013, then one of the largest oil companies of Russia, Rosneft became the world's largest publicly traded petroleum company.

Rosneft is the third largest Russian company and the second-largest state-controlled company (after Gazprom) in Russia in terms of revenue (₽4,134 billion). Internationally, it is one of the largest oil companies, ranking 24 in terms of revenue. In the 2020 Forbes Global 2000, Rosneft was ranked as the 53rd-largest public company in the world. The company operates in more than twenty countries around the world.

History

Origins 
Rosneft has played a major role in the history of Russia's oil industry. The first use of the name Rosneft dates back to the late 19th century, when exploration of oil fields in Sakhalin began in 1889. Most of Rosneft's current assets were established during the Soviet era.

1990s 

Rosneft was established in 1993 as a unitary enterprise with assets previously held by Rosneftegaz, the successor to the Soviet Union's Ministry of Oil Industry. During the early 1990s, almost all Russian oil companies and refineries were extracted from Rosneft to form ten integrated companies. Later their number was halved as a result of acquisitions. On 29 September 1995, an Order of the Government of Russia No. 971 transformed Rosneft into an open joint stock company.

In March 1996, Rosneft founded the Russian Regional Development Bank. 

Rosneft struggled financially and operationally during the 1998 Russian financial crisis with decreased production due to poor assets and decreased retail sales with an underused refining capacity. In July 1998 the Russian government tried to sell Rosneft, but it failed.

In October 1998, the Russian government appointed Sergey Bogdanchikov as president. The company owned two obsolete refineries and several low-productive and poorly managed oil-producing assets. In the late 1990s, plans for Rosneft's privatization in Russia were made, but due to competition with equally influential pretenders, they were not carried out.

2000s 
From 2002 to 2004, the main objectives of the company were to strengthen control over its assets, reduce the debt burden, and to obtain licenses in Eastern Siberia. The determining factor in enhancing the role of Rosneft in the Russian oil industry has been the support of the country's top leadership. The company, during this time, managed to restore its status after its rough start in the 1990s with the acquisition of Krasnodar Oil and Gas Company in 2002 and Northern Oil Company in early 2003. In addition, in 2002, the company received a license for the development of the Sakhalin-IV and Sakhalin-V project, and in 2003 a license for the development of the Sakhalin-III project.

In 2005, Rosneft acquired a 25.94% stake in the company Verkhnechonskneftegaz and became the leading oil company of Russia in terms of production.

In 2007, the company for the first time entered the annual list of one hundred most respected firms and companies in the world according to the weekly Barron's, in 99th place. By the same year, Rosneft produced 100 million barrels of oil, 20% of Russia's output at the time. In March 2007, Rosneft had announced it hoped to increase production from 80 million tonnes to 103 million tonnes from 2006 to the end of 2007, extract 140 million tonnes of oil by 2012, and become a global top three energy company.

When the Great Recession struck Russia in late 2008, Rosneft was able to endure the economic pains by improving and strengthening business lines, management, and transparency, and as a result, became a leading oil company domestically and internationally.

In February 2009, a number of agreements were negotiated between Russia and China that provided a 20-year contract for an annual supply of 15 million tons of oil between the Chinese National Petroleum Corporation (CNPC) and Rosneft, cooperation between CNPC and Transneft to construct and operate a branch of the Eastern Siberia–Pacific Ocean (ESPO) oil pipeline to China, and the provision of loans for US$25 billion—US$15 billion from Rosneft and US$10 billion from Transneft—by the China Development Bank on the security of supplies.

Acquisition of assets of Yukos

Starting in 2004, the Russian government organized a series of auctions to sell the assets of Yukos Oil Company, of which Rosneft won the majority. On 22 December 2004, Rosneft had purchased Baikal Finance Group which bought Yuganskneftegaz (Yugansk), a main asset of Yukos, three days earlier at a state-run auction for US$9.35 billion to satisfy tax debts. According to some estimates, this operation was directed by Russian authorities in order to nationalize Russia's oil and gas industry. In response to the deal, Andrei Illarionov, then a senior Putin economic advisor, denounced it as "fraud of the year".

In 2005, Mikhail Khodorkovsky (former chairman of Menatep) and Platon Lebedev (business partner of Khodorkovsky) were sentenced to nine years in prison for fraud and tax evasion. In February 2007, they were charged again and accused of stealing $25 billion worth of oil from Yukos subsidiaries. They were convicted, but in 2013 Putin pardoned Khodorkovsky and 2014 the Russian supreme court announced that Lebedev should also be freed early.

The purchase of Yugansk in 2005 greatly increase the number of assets and production for Rosneft. Subsequently, Rosneft filed a lawsuit against Yukos in connection with the use of the understated transfer prices for the purchase of oil from Yuganskneftegaz prior to its breakup. At the same time, Rosneft itself also purchases oil and gas from its subsidiary, Yuganskneftegaz, at transfer prices.

In May 2007, Rosneft won a number of auctions for the sale of Yukos' assets, including five refineries and oil companies Tomsk Oil Company and Samara Oil and Gas Company, making it the largest oil company in Russia. According to experts on the Russian newspaper Vedomosti, the assets of Yukos, bought by Rosneft at auction organized by the state, went to the company at a discount of 43.4% of the market price of this property. In 2007, the former assets of Yukos provided 72.6% of oil and gas condensate production and 74.2% of Rosneft's primary refining. In June, Rosneft paid $731 million for the transportation assets of Yukos, which had declared bankrupt in August 2006 after three years of litigation over tax arrears. In August, Bogdanchikov said that although the Yukos acquisitions had increased Rosnefts debt to $US 26 billion, he planned to reduce debt to 30% of total assets by 2010 by tripling refining capacity and expand into China.

Initial public offering of 2006
In July 2006, Rosneft placed 15% of its shares traded with a total value of US$10.7 billion in an initial public offering (IPO) at the London Stock Exchange, the Russian Trading System, and the Moscow Interbank Currency Exchange. Part of the shares were distributed among the Russian population through banks such as Sberbank and Gazprombank.

The Federal Service for Financial Markets authorized the placement and circulation outside the country of a 22.5% stake in Rosneft. 

Rosneft announced a placement value of US$5.85–7.85 per share and global depository receipt (GDR), based on the company's capitalization after consolidation of US$60–80 billion. It was planned to place shares for at least US$8.5 billion in order to repay loans to Western banks, including interest and taxes.

On 14 July, the official results of the placement value were announced. Shares were priced at US$7.55, almost at the upper end of the price band, resulting in Rosneft's capitalization—taking into account the upcoming consolidation of its subsidiaries—at a value of US$79.8 billion, making Rosneft surpass Lukoil as the largest oil company in Russia. Investors bought 1.38 billion shares for US$10.4 billion: 21% of the shares were bought by strategic investors, 36% from international investors from North America, Europe, and Asia, 39% from Russian investors, and 4% from Russian retail investors. 49.4% of the total IPO volume accounted for four investors, including BP for US$1 billion, Petronas for US$1.5 billion, and the CNPC for $0.5 billion. Individuals submitted applications for the purchase of 99,431,775 shares of the oil company, and as a result, most of the new shareholders were individuals; partly because of this IPO was given the unofficial name of "people's."

Rosneft's IPO became the largest in the history of Russia and the fifth in the world in terms of the amount of money raised at the time. The announced amount could increase by another US$400 million if the global placement coordinators realize the option of buying another 53 million GDRs of Rosneft at the price of placement within 30 days.

On Abkhazia 

On 26 May 2009, a five-year cooperation agreement was negotiated between Rosneft and the Abkhazia's Ministry of Economy. The parties stated their intention to develop mutually beneficial cooperation in areas as geological prospecting, development of oil and gas fields, production of hydrocarbons, and sale of oil, natural gas and oil products. Rosneft undertook exploration on the shelf in the Ochamchira area, discovering preliminary reserves estimated at 200 million to 500 million tons of oil equivalent. In addition to drilling and creating its own sales network, Rosneft also planned the construction of mini-refineries in Abkhazia.

According to Rosneft, the company provides more than half of the retail sales of oil products in Abkhazia. In 2014, Rosneft exported 47 thousand tons of oil products to Abkhazia. Since 2015, Rosneft started supplying aviation fuel for Sukhumi Babushara Airport.

As part of the project to develop the Gudauta area on the Black Sea shelf, Rosneft will carry out a full range of geophysical and geochemical research, conduct 2D and 3D seismic surveys, and start preparations for exploratory drilling. In June 2014, Rosneft extended the shelf study period to five years.

In July 2015, however, the new President of Abkhazia, Raul Khajimba, who replaced Alexander Ankvab after his resignation, spoke out against the exploration and production of oil on the offshore shelf of Abkhazia and asked the People's Assembly to consider the possibility of establishing a "commission for the comprehensive study of issues related to the conclusion of contracts for exploration and production hydrocarbons by the previous Abkhaz leadership."

A group of deputies of the People's Assembly drafted a bill banning the development of hydrocarbons in Abkhazia. Supporters of the bill demanded the prohibition of the development of the offshore shelf in Abkhazia for 30 years.

2010s 
In September 2010, Eduard Khudainatov replaced Sergei Bogdanchikov as CEO of the company.

On 15 October 2010, Russian President Dmitry Medvedev signed an agreement with President of Venezuela Hugo Chávez for the PDVSA to sell 50% of the shares of German company Ruhr Oel to Rosneft, giving Rosneft oil refining assets in Germany.

Since 23 May 2012, former Deputy Prime Minister Igor Sechin became the company's CEO, succeeding Khudaninatov, who received the post of vice-president.

In the summer of 2012, Rosneft purchased a fuel oil terminal from the United Shipbuilding Corporation (USC) located on the territory of the Murmansk Ship Repair Plant No. 35. The transaction value is estimated at US$28 million. According to Kommersant, the Murmansk terminal can be used as a platform for Rosneft's activities in the Arctic.

In October 2016, Rosneft bought a 49% stake in Essar Oil of India, along with Russian investment fund United Capital, in a deal worth $13 billion.

On 7 December 2016, Rosneft signed a deal to sell 19.5% of the outstanding shares, or roughly US$11 billion, to the Anglo-Swiss multinational commodity trader Glencore and the Qatar Investment Authority. Officially, the stake was split 50/50 between Glencore and Qatar, but Glencore contributed only €300 million and claims only a 0.54% stake. The ownership structure includes a Cayman Islands company, QHG Cayman Limited, whose ownership can not be traced. After the transaction, Rosneft's holding company Rosneftegaz retained 50% + 1 share of the company.

On 2 October 2017, the PLA-linked CEFC China Energy bought a $9 billion stake in Rosneft.

On 26 September 2017, the Russian government controversially approved the former German chancellor Gerhard Schröder as chairman of Rosneft.

In May 2018, it was announced that the Qatar-Glencore consortium is cancelling the plan to sell a $9.1 billion (14%) stake of Rosneft to CEFC China Energy. With the dissolution of the consortium, the Qatar Investment Authority purchased the shares instead, thereby solidifying its position as one of the biggest shareholders (19%) of Rosneft.

In the 2010s, the extensive contact between Rosneft and ExxonMobil were further deepened, with Igor Sechin and Rex Tillerson getting to know each other personally.

Arctic shelf deals with BP and ExxonMobil

On 15 January 2011, Rosneft and British Petroleum (BP) announced a deal to develop the East-Prinovozemelsky field on the Russian arctic shelf between the Yamal Peninsula and Novaya Zemlya island. As part of the deal Rosneft was to receive 5% of BP's shares, worth approximately $7.8 billion, as of January 2011 and BP would get approximately 9.5% of Rosneft's shares in exchange. According to the deal, the two companies would create an Arctic technology centre in Russia to develop technologies and engineering practices for safe arctic hydrocarbons extraction. AAR, which represents four billionaires of Russian origin and is BP's Russian partner in the TNK-BP joint venture, blocked the BP–Rosneft deal in international courts, arguing it breached earlier contracts between BP and AAR. The TNK-BP partners had previously signed a shareholding agreement which stipulated that their Russian joint venture would be the primary corporate vehicle for BP's oil and gas operations in Russia. On 30 August 2011, Rosneft announced that instead of BP the partner for EPNZ-1, EPNZ-2 and EPNZ-3 in the Kara Sea will be ExxonMobil. In exchange, subject to approval by U.S. regulators, in addition to a share in oil production in Russian fields, Rosneft was granted participation in U.S. fields in Texas and the Gulf of Mexico.

Black Sea shelf deal with ExxonMobil
On 27 January 2011, Rosneft and the American company ExxonMobil signed a deal to establish a joint venture for the purpose of prospecting and extracting oil from the Tuapse field deepwater area on the Black Sea shelf, near the coast of the Krasnodar Krai. The value of the deal is unknown, but ExxonMobil is expected to invest $1 billion in the project. The venture will be shared 50–50 between the companies during prospecting phase, and two-thirds to one-third in Rosneft's favour during the extraction phase. The Tuapse Trough is estimated to contain 7.2 billion barrels of oil equivalent. The first well could be drilled in 2012. The deal also contains options for additional cooperation, such as extended exploration and production, deliveries to Rosneft's oil refinery in Tuapse, development of transport infrastructure and research on offshore oil production technologies. According to analysts, offshore areas are central to Rosneft's expansionist plans, and the company is looking for foreign cooperation to bring in new technology and share risks.

In April 2017, the Trump administration denied ExxonMobil permission to continue a deal with Rosneft to drill for oil in Russia.

TNK-BP acquisition
On 22 October 2012, it was announced that Rosneft will take over TNK-BP International, a parent company of TNK-BP Holding, which is the third largest oil company in Russia. BP will receive in exchange of its stake $12.3 billion of cash and 18.5% of Rosneft's share, while ARR will receive $28 billion in cash. According to Rosneft's CEO Igor Sechin, no discussion had been held on a buyout of minority shareholders in TNK-BP Holding. The deal was completed on 20 March 2013.

2020s
On 27 February 2022, BP announced that it would divest its 19.75% stake in Rosneft in response to the  Russian invasion of Ukraine that took place in February 2022.

The week beginning 19 April 2022, Rosneft attempted to sell millions of barrels of Urals, one of three main export-grade crude oils sold by Russia. The offer failed to attract any customers.

Following the 2022 Russian invasion of Ukraine more than half of Rosneft's 11-member board have quit, forcing the company into a major reshuffle at its annual general meeting on 30 June 2022. Taieb Belmahdi, a former executive at Qatar's state-owned QE, has been elected chairman of the board to replace ex-German chancellor Gerhard Schröder who stepped down in May.

Sanctions
On 16 July 2014, the Obama administration imposed sanctions through the US Department of Treasury's Office of Foreign Assets Control (OFAC) by adding Rosneft and other entities to the Sectoral Sanctions List (SSL) in retaliation for the annexation of the Crimean Peninsula by the Kremlin and the ongoing Russian interference in Ukraine.

The Trump administration expanded further sanctions on its Swiss-incorporated company (Rosneft Trading S.A.) and its president Didier Casimiro on 18 February 2020, for supporting Venezuela's Nicolás Maduro regime by operating in the oil sector of the Venezuelan economy.

In March 2022, as a result of the 2022 Russian invasion of Ukraine the EU imposed sanctions on Rosneft.

Sanctioned by New Zealand.

Operations

Total crude oil output reached  of oil and gas condensate. Rosneft is engaged in exploration and production across all key oil and gas regions of Russia: Western Siberia, Southern and Central Russia, Timan-Pechora, Eastern Siberia, the Far East, and the shelf of Russia's Arctic Ocean. Rosneft is also second-to-none in terms of total proved liquid hydrocarbon reserves.

In 2016, based on geological prospecting, 13 oil fields and 127 new deposits with the reserves totaling 207 million tons of oil equivalent were discovered. The replacement of hydrocarbon reserves of industrial categories ABC1 amounted to 354 million TOE or 126% of the production in Russia. The replacement factor for new reserves has been significantly above 100% for over ten years.

Five new deposits with reserves of 39 million tons of oil equivalent were discovered. In 2016, the total incremental  of gas. 37 well tests were completed with a success rate of 76%.

The refineries are able to process about 45% of crude oil produced by Rosneft as a whole. Rosneft owns as well a 50% stake in Ruhr Oel GmbH, the owner of stakes in four refineries in Germany with overall capacity of 23.2 million tonnes. Rosneft is the second largest national oil company by retail network, which covers 41 regions of Russia and includes 1,800 filling stations. In March 2020, the company stopped its operations in Venezuela and sold all of its assets in the country to another unnamed company that is owned by the Russian government.

Corporate affairs

Shareholders 
Prior to the initial public offering (IPO) in 2006, all of Rosneft's shares were owned by the Russian government through its holding company JSC Rosneftegaz. After the placement of the company's shares on the stock exchange and the consolidation of shares of 12 subsidiaries (including Yuganskneftegaz) of Rosneft, the share of Rosneftegaz decreased to 75.16%. As of September 2012, Rosneft had over 160,000 shareholders. By December 2016, the number of individual shareholders was 138,000, with Rosneftegaz owning only 50% of the shares, BP owning 19.75%, and 30.25% owned by other shareholders. In August 2021 Igor Sechin increased his own share at Rosneft from 0.1273% up to 0.1288%.

Management

Board of directors 
Members of the board of directors (as of June 2022):
 Taieb Belmahdi – Chairman
 Igor Sechin – CEO, Deputy Chairman
 Aleksander Nekipelov – Deputy Chairman, Independent director
 Andrey Akimov
 Hamad Rashid Al-Mohannadi
 Faisal Alsuwaidi
 Pedro А. Aquino, Jr.
 Vladimir Litvinenko
 Alexander Novak
 Maxim Oreshkin
 Aleksandr Uss

Management board 
Members of the management board:
 Igor Sechin – CEO, Chairman
 Yuri Kalinin – Deputy Chairman, Vice President
 Eric M. Liron – First Vice President
 Gennady Bukaev – Vice President, Head of Internal Audit
 Didier Casimiro – Vice President for Refining, Petrochemical, Commerce, and Logistics
 Peter Lazarev – Financial director
 Yury Narushevich – Vice President for Internal Services
 Zeljko Runje – Vice President for Offshore Projects
 Yuri Kurilin – Vice President, Chief of Staff
 Andrey Shishkin – Vice President for Energy, Localization, and Innovation
 Vlada Rusakova – Vice President

Social policy 
In 2011, according to Rosneft, the company had donated $422 million to charity, 4 times than the previous year, becoming the leading Russian company devoted to philanthropy that year. At the same time, the composition of the beneficiaries were not disclosed as it was known that the oil company had previously committed to pay $180 million for the right to be the general sponsor of the 2014 Winter Olympics in Sochi.

Since 2012, Rosneft, along with Gazprom, is the title sponsor of the association football team FC Tom Tomsk based in Tomsk.

Rosneft has been ranked as among the 13th best of 92 oil, gas, and mining companies on indigenous rights and resource extraction in the Arctic.

Controversies

Violations of anti-monopoly legislation 
In October 2009, the Federal Antimonopoly Service (FAS) imposed on Rosneft a record fine of ₽5.3 billion ($175M) for violating anti-monopoly legislation. The fine was imposed for the abuse of power in the petroleum market recorded in the first half of 2009, which was expressed in the "seizure of goods from circulation, which led to higher prices in the wholesale segment of the oil products market, creating discriminatory conditions for the sale of oil products to individual counter-parties." As FAS has calculated, these actions led to an increase in prices in the wholesale markets of motor gasoline, diesel fuel, and aviation kerosene in the first half of 2009.

Western claims from Yukos Capital 
On August 9 2010, a former subsidiary of Yukos, Yukos Capital Sarl of Luxembourg, was seeking to have Rosneft repay the debts of companies that previously belonged to Yukos. After the seizure of Rosneft's assets in the United Kingdom and the denial of an appeal by the Supreme Court of the Netherlands, Rosneft said that Yukos Capital paid Yuganskneftegaz its debt of ₽12.9 billion ($426M).

On 16 August 2010, Yukos Capital appealed to the Federal Arbitration Court of the West Siberian District with a cassation appeal against the decision of the Arbitration Court of Tomsk Oblast to refuse reclaiming from Tomskneft, a Rosneft subsidiary, more than ₽7 billion ($231M) under loan agreements. Previously, Yukos Capital applied to international arbitration under the International Chamber of Commerce, and it obliged Tomskneft to pay ₽7,254.2 million ($239M), $275,200, and £52,960, with an interest rate of 9% per annum for the amount of ₽4,350 million ($144M), starting from 12 February 2009 until the day of payment of the debt. The Russian court had to bring the court's decision to Russian territory. However, the Arbitration Court of Tomsk Oblast, having considered the claim, ruled to refuse Yukos Capital in debt collection.

Ulyukayev lawsuit 
On December 15 2017, a Moscow court sentenced Alexei Ulyukayev, a former Russian economy minister to paying ₽130M ($2.2M) and eight years in a penal colony for bribery and corruption. The case was widely seen as Rosneft CEO Sechin’s revenge for Ulyukayev opposing Rosneft’s takeover of Bashneft, another oil company. The 61-year-old claimed that Sechin had lured him to Rosneft's offices, where he was subsequently caught red-handed by the authorities with a bag of bribe money. According to investigators, Ulyukayev, who was still economy minister at the time of his arrest, had taken the $2M bribe in exchange for permitting Rosneft's acquisition of a stake in Bashneft. Ulyukayev retorted that the "fabricated" accusations of bribery were "based solely on Sechin's claims," and that the whole exchange had been engineered by the Russian Federal Security Service, the successor of the KGB.

Ulyukayev was seen as an economic liberal, Igor Sechin is viewed as a hawk, who supports greater state control over the economy. Ulyukayev, while influential, was not part of President Putin's inner circle.

Oil spills 
The Russian branch of Greenpeace called Rosneft the dirtiest oil company in the world. In 2011, according to a survey conducted by the Federal Service for Supervision in the Sphere of Nature Management (Rosprirodnadzor) in Khanty-Mansi Autonomous Okrug, Rosneft allowed 2,727 oil spills, which is 75% of the total number of spills that occurs under the company. According to environmentalists, it is Rosneft's fault that more than 10,000 oil spills occur each year. The Hydrometeorological Centre of Russia has estimated that 4.5m tonnes of oil are spilled on the Russian mainland every year, that's seven times the BP Deepwater Horizon spill in the Gulf of Mexico in 2010. Often blamed is Rosneft's ageing infrastructure, so is the lack of government oversight. As a result of the environmental contamination, people have observed black water coming out of their taps, cattle has been stricken with tuberculosis, and fish have been found deformed.

Fracking 
In the first half of the 2000s, Sergei Bogdanchikov, then president of Rosneft, along with some journalists and experts, criticized Yukos and Sibneft for their use of hydraulic fracturing. However, in early November 2006, a number of journalists pointed out that the Priobskoye oil field of which it is owned by RN-Yuganskneftegaz, a subsidiary of Rosneft acquired from Yukos, produced the largest oil fracture in Russia with specialists of Newco Well Service. The operation was conducted for seven hours and was broadcast live via the Internet to the office of Yuganskneftegaz. In 2007, the company planned to perform hydraulic fracturing of the formation at 440 wells. From 2009 to 2010, Rosneft remains one of the largest customers of the oilfield services company Schlumberger, which specializes in hydraulic fracturing.

Sanctions 
On 20 March 2014, the United States government sanctioned Rosneft CEO Igor Sechin in response to the Russian government's role in the ongoing unrest in Ukraine. The sanctions include a travel ban to the United States, freezing of all assets of Sechin in the United States and a ban on business transactions between American citizens and corporations and Sechin and businesses he owns. On February 24 2022, his son Ivan Sechin was also sanctioned by the U.S. On February 28 2022, Igor Sechin was subjected to travel restrictions and had his assets frozen by the EU. 

Rosneft and many of its subsidiaries have been sanctioned in the past and appear on the Sectoral Sanctions Identification (SSI) List. Rosneft was added to the SSI on July 16 2014, and was sanctioned by the EU on September 8 2014.

On February 18, 2020, the US Department of the Treasury’s Office of Foreign Assets Control (“OFAC”) added Rosneft Trading S.A., a Swiss subsidiary of Rosneft, and its president Didier Casimiro to the Specially Designated Nationals (“SDN”) list.

Transparency 
As of 1 May 2014, the heads of Russian state corporations would provide information about their incomes and property to the Russian government to correspond to the presidential decree Anti-Corruption Issues, which was published on 8 July 2013. According to the ruling, websites of the companies should show the personal information of their top managers such as income, property, spouses, and children. However, Rosneft refused to publish its information of top managers, citing that it is only applicable to "state companies (corporations) and other organizations created by federal laws," to which it does not believe itself to be. However, this did not prevent the company from providing information regarding the incomes and property of Rosneft's top managers and their relatives to "competent authorities" in the prescribed "time and amount". According to the director of the Russian branch of Transparency International, Elena Panfilova, improvement of such legislation is necessary so that state corporations can unequivocally interpret the norm on the publication of personal information. In July, the Russian government announced that information of the income of top management of companies listed in Government Decree No. 613 July 22, 2013 which includes Rosneft, "are subject to placement in the information and telecommunications network 'Internet' on the official websites of these organizations."

See also

 List of countries by oil exports
 List of countries by oil production
 List of countries by natural gas exports
 List of companies of Russia
 List of oil exploration and production companies
 Petroleum industry in Russia

References

Further reading
 Stuart D. Goldman (2006) CRS Report for Congress
 Bernard A. Gelb (2006) Russian Oil and Gas Challenges
 Energy Information Administration (EIA). Russia Country Analysis Brief,
 TNK-BP. Kovykta Project Viewed 28 December 2005
 Mevlut Katik (2003)Blue Stream's Pipeline's Future in Doubt Amid Russian Turkish Pricing Dispute
 Yukos Receives Bill for Nearly $1 billion in Back Taxes October 2004
 Gazprom to acquire Yuganskneftegaz buyer December 2004
 Rosnef Magazine 2006
 Shamil Yenikeyeff (2011) "BP, Russian billionaires, and the Kremlin: a Power Triangle that never was"

External links

  
 Rosneft Oil production, refining, reserves and capex by division, segment and period (Grmike, wikinvest) 
 Yahoo! OAO Rosneft Oil Company Company Profile 
 Rosneft Oil analytics information 
 Rosneft ecosystem in Russia (2013)

 
1993 establishments in Russia
Companies based in Moscow
Companies listed on the London Stock Exchange
Companies listed on the Moscow Exchange
Energy companies established in 1993
Government-owned companies of Russia
Rus
Natural gas companies of Russia
Oil companies of Russia
Russian brands
Russian entities subject to the U.S. Department of the Treasury sanctions
Yukos